Marco Antonio Pasqualini (stage name Malagigi; 25 April 1614 – 2 July 1691) was an Italian castrato opera singer who performed during the Baroque period. He has been described as "the leading male soprano of his day". Pasqualini joined the choir of the Sistine Chapel in 1630. He was also a composer, having written more than 250 arias and cantatas.

Despite being historically addressed as a soprano, Pasqualini's vocal range extended no higher than B5.  Thus, he was a mezzo-soprano by modern classification.

Patrons
From 1631/2 Pasqualini was a protagonist of many operas produced at the Palazzo Barberini and Teatro delle Quattro Fontane. He benefited greatly from the generosity of his patrons, the Barberini family of Pope Urban VIII, who were enthusiastic supporters of early opera.

Pasqualini is thought to have conducted an ongoing homosexual relationship with one of his patrons, Cardinal Antonio Barberini. Contemporary testimony leaves little doubt that the "veritable passion" the cardinal felt extended to more than Pasqualini's beautiful voice.

References

1614 births
1691 deaths
Italian opera singers
Castrati
Italian male classical composers
Italian Baroque composers
17th-century Italian composers
17th-century male musicians